Blizna  is a village in the administrative district of Gmina Nowinka, within Augustów County, Podlaskie Voivodeship, in north-eastern Poland.

Blizna settlement is located at the edge of a forest complex along the small Blizna road with a train stop nearby; a short train-ride north-east from Augustów.

References
Notes

Blizna